Maria W. Stewart ( Miller) (1803 – December 17, 1879) was an American teacher, journalist, abolitionist and lecturer known for her role in the anti-slavery and women's rights movements in the United States. The first known American woman to speak to a mixed audience of men and women, white and black, she was also the first African American woman to make public lectures, as well as to lecture about women's rights and make a public anti-slavery speech.

The Liberator published two pamphlets by Stewart: Religion and the Pure Principles of Morality, The Sure Foundation on Which We Must Build (which called for abolition and Black autonomy) in 1831, and another of religious meditations, Meditations from the Pen of Mrs. Maria Stewart (1832). In February 1833, she addressed Boston's African Masonic Lodge, which soon ended her brief lecturing career. 

Her claim that black men lacked "ambition and requisite courage" caused an uproar among the audience, and Stewart decided to retire from giving lectures. Seven months later, she gave a farewell address at a schoolroom in the African Meeting House ("Paul's Church"). After this, she moved to New York City, then to Baltimore, and finally Washington, D.C., where she worked as a schoolteacher, and then head matron at Freedmen's Hospital, where she eventually died.

Early life
She was born Maria Miller, the child of free African-American parents in Hartford, Connecticut. In 1806, At the age of three she lost both parents and was sent to live with a minister and his family. She continued as an indentured servant in that home until she was 15, without receiving any formal education. After leaving the minister's household, she moved to Boston and worked as a domestic servant. Between the ages of 15 and 20, Maria attended Sabbath School before church service on Sundays and developed a lifelong affinity for religious work.

On August 10, 1826, Maria Miller married James W. Stewart, an independent shipping agent, before the Reverend Thomas Paul, pastor of the African Meeting House, in Boston, Massachusetts. She took not only his last name but his middle initial. Their marriage lasted only three years and produced no children. James Stewart died in 1829.

The executors of his estate deprived Maria as his widow of any inheritance. This moment spurred Stewart to begin thinking about women's rights and the inequities they faced. James had served in the War of 1812 and eventually a law was passed allowing veterans' widows their husbands' pensions.

Public speaking
Stewart was the first American woman to speak to a mixed audience of men, women, white people and Blacks (termed a "promiscuous" audience during the early 19th century). The first African-American woman to lecture about women's rights — Stewart focused particularly on the rights of Black women — religion, and social justice among Black people. She was someone who could be called a Matronist: one of the matriarchs of Black feminist thought during the Jim Crow era. She also became the first African-American woman to speak publicly calling for the abolition of slavery. 

One of the first African-American women to make public lectures for which there are still surviving copies, Stewart referred to her public lectures as "speeches" and not "sermons", despite their religious tone and frequent Biblical quotes. African-American women preachers of the era, such as Jarena Lee, Julia Foote and Amanda Berry Smith, undoubtedly influenced Stewart, and Sojourner Truth later used a similar style in her public lectures. Stewart delivered her speeches in Boston, to organizations including the African-American Female Intelligence Society.

David Walker, a prosperous clothing shop owner, who was a well-known, outspoken member of the General Colored Association, also influenced Stewart. (A house at 81 Joy Street where from 1827 till 1829 Walker and his wife were tenants subsequently also became home to Stewart.) A leader within Boston's African-American enclave, Walker wrote a very controversial piece on race relations entitled David Walker's Appeal to the Coloured Citizens of the World (1829).

In 1830, he was found dead outside of his shop, just one year after Stewart's husband had died. These events precipitated a "born again" spiritual experience for Stewart. She became a vocal and militant advocate for "Africa, freedom and God's cause". 

However, she was far less militant than Walker, and resisted advocating violence. Instead, Stewart put forth African-American exceptionalism, the special bond she saw between God and African Americans, and advocated social and moral advancement, even as she vocally protested against social conditions African Americans experienced, and touched on several political issues.

In 1831, before her public speaking career began, Stewart published a small pamphlet entitled Religion and the Pure Principles of Morality, the Sure Foundation on Which We Must Build. In September of 1832, Steward held her first speech, which was likely the first public speech given by a woman in America of any race. In 1832, she published a collection of religious meditations, Meditations from the Pen of Mrs. Maria Stewart. She wrote and delivered four lectures between 1832 and 1833, including an adapted version of her Religion pamphlet delivered to the African American Female Intelligence Society in April 1832. While her speeches were daring and not well received, William Lloyd Garrison, a friend and the central figure of the abolitionist (anti-slavery) movement, published all four in his newspaper, The Liberator, the first three individually, and later, all four together. Garrison also recruited Stewart to write for The Liberator in 1831.

Stewart's public-speaking career lasted three years. She delivered her farewell lectures on September 21, 1833, in the schoolroom of the African Meeting House, known then as the Belknap Street Church, and as of 2019 part of Boston's Black Heritage Trail. Upon leaving Boston, she first moved to New York, where she published her collected works in 1835. She taught school and participated in the abolitionist movement, as well as literary organization. Stewart then moved to Baltimore and eventually to Washington, D.C., where she also taught school before becoming head matron (nurse) of the Freedmen's Hospital and Asylum in Washington, later the medical school of Howard University. She ultimately died at that hospital.

Writings
In her writings, Stewart was very cogent when she talked about the plight of black people. She said, "Every man has a right to express his opinion. Many think, because your skins are tinged with a sable hue, that you are an inferior race of beings ... Then why should one worm say to another, Keep you down there, while I sit up yonder; for I am better than thou. It is not the color of the skin that makes the man, but it is the principle formed within the soul".

She believed that education, particularly religious education, would help lift black people out of ignorance and poverty. She was also denounced the racist laws that prevented black people from accessing schools, the vote or other basic rights. "She expressed concern for African Americans' temporal affairs and eternal salvation and urged them to develop their talents and intellect, live moral lives, and devote themselves to racial activism. Stewart challenged her audience to emulate the valor of the pilgrims and American revolutionaries in demanding freedom, and advised them to establish institutions such as grocery stores and churches to support their community." Stewart's radical point of view was not well received by her audience. William Lloyd Garrison said of her,

Your whole adult life has been devoted to the noble task of educating and elevating your people, sympathizing with them in their affliction, and assisting them in their needs; and, though advanced in years, you are still animated with the spirit of your earlier life, and striving to do what in you lies to succor the outcast, reclaim the wanderer, and lift up the fallen. In this blessed work may you be generously assisted by those to whom you may make your charitable appeals, and who may have the means to give efficiency to your efforts.

She wanted to help the black community to do and be better as they circumnavigated their way around a country where racial subjugation was the law of the land.

Evangelism
Maria W. Stewart was influenced heavily by the Bible and Christian imagery in her writings and speeches. She evangelized during a time when educated women, especially educated black women, were frowned upon. She once wrote,

having lost my position in Williamsburg, Long Island, and hearing the colored people were more religious and God-fearing in the South, I wended my way to Baltimore in 1852. But I found all was not gold that glistened; and when I saw the want of means for the advancement of the common English branches, with no literary resources for the improvement of the mind scarcely, I threw myself at the foot of the Cross, resolving to make the best of a bad bargain ...

Stewart was shocked at the miserable conditions of black people in Maryland, a slave state, where a relatively high percentage of black people were free. She eventually took a job as a teacher where she taught reading, writing, spelling and arithmetic. She was paid 50 cents a month while white teachers were paid $1. Her salary was barely enough to cover her monthly expenses. She readily admitted she was not good at handling her finances and to some degree people took advantage.

Women evangelists were often very poor and leaned on the kindness of strangers, friends and religious leaders to help sustain them. One such friend went by the name of Elizabeth Keckley, a former slave, seamstress and civil rights activist she wrote of fondly, "There was a lady, Mrs. Keckley, I knew, formerly from Baltimore, who proved to be an ardent friend to me in my great emergency. ..."  Stewart was born free and Keckley a slave, but both women saw a need to be active in the burgeoning civil rights movement of the late 19th century.

The preaching of God's word during the 1800s was seen in society as a male role even among some black religious institutions. As one writer said: Women in the black churches were relegated to positions that posed no real threat to the power structure maintained by preachers, deacons, and other male leaders. Women were usually assigned roles of Sunday school teachers, exhorters, secretaries, cooks, and cleaners. Such positions paralleled those reserved for women within the domestic sphere of the home."

Stewart believed that she was called to do God's work even at great peril to herself. She used her platform to talk about racial injustices and sexism by highlighting the contradictions between the message of peace and unity preached from the pulpits of the white churches versus the reality of the slavery. According to one writer:

"For Stewart, this ... newly freed community ... barely one generation from slavery, yearning for a fully realized freedom rather than a nominal one. Given the small size of the free Black community, it is easy to assume solidarity, cohesion, and unquestioned allegiance to the Black church. But just as revolutionary Americans had to grapple with what it meant to be 'American,'... Blacks ... just 50 years from slavery in Massachusetts, were grappling with their identity as free people, and there were likely competing agendas being cast forth of what Blacks should 'do' and how they should operate."Between January 7, 1832 and May 4, 1833, William Lloyd Garrison's newspaper, The Liberator, published six articles by Stewart. In these articles, Stewart spoke in two seemingly contradictory registers as she described God's interactions with humanity. On the one hand, she portrayed a gentle God who directed his angels to carry oppressed individuals "into Abraham's bosom [where] they shall be comforted"; on the other hand, she warned sinners—specifically white American sinners—of a wrathful and violent God who was on the verge of sending "horror and devastation" to the world. While these two images may seem paradoxical to contemporary readers, they reflect the connection between sympathy and violence that permeated Stewart's theology and structured her concept of Christian community. She believed God's compassion for suffering believers would motivate him to punish their tormenters and that African American Christians should follow his example by protecting one another with force if necessary.

This juxtaposition of Christian mercy and retributive violence also points to the crucial but often minimized role of African American women such as Stewart who were uniquely situated to collaborate with black nationalists and white abolitionists. As an important figure in radical political action, Stewart helps us to better understand the multivalent forces that shaped resistance movements in the early nineteenth century.

Speeches
Maria Stewart delivered four public lectures that The Liberator published during her lifetime, addressing women's rights, moral and educational aspiration, occupational advancement, and the abolition of slavery.

She delivered the lecture "Why Sit Ye Here and Die?" on September 21, 1832, at Franklin Hall, Boston, to the New England Anti-Slavery Society. She demanded equal rights for African-American women:

In the same speech Stewart emphasized that African-American women were not so different from African-American men:

She continued the theme that African Americans were subjected not only to Southern slavery but to Northern racism and economic structures:

Notably, Stewart critiqued Northern treatment of African Americans at a meeting in which Northerners gathered to criticize and plan action against Southern treatment of African Americans. She challenged the supposed dichotomy between the inhumane enslavement of the South and the normal proceedings of capitalism in the North, arguing that the relegation of African Americans to service jobs was also a great injustice and waste of human potential. In doing so, she anticipated arguments about the intersection of racism, capitalism, and sexism that would later be advanced by womanist thinkers.

Her Christian faith strongly influenced Stewart. She often cited Biblical influences and the Holy Spirit, and implicitly critiqued societal failure to educate her and others like her:

Maria W. Stewart delivered the speech entitled "An Address: African Rights and Liberty" to a mixed audience at the African Masonic Hall in Boston on February 27, 1833. It was not received well and it would be her last public address before she embarked on a life of activism. The speech says in part:

This very powerful and thought provoking speech about the greatness of African-American people gives us today a glimpse into the mind of an important historical figure in African-American history.

Death and legacy
Stewart died at Freedmen's Hospital on December 17, 1879. She was originally buried in Graceland Cemetery, which closed two decades later after extensive litigation and most of the land used by the Washington Electric Railway. She was reinterred at Woodlawn Cemetery.

Stewart is included in Daughters of Africa: An International Anthology of Words and Writings by Women of African Descent, edited by Margaret Busby (1992), the title of which is inspired by Stewart's 1831 declaration, in which she said:

O, ye daughters of Africa, awake! awake! arise! no longer sleep nor slumber, but distinguish yourselves. Show forth to the world that ye are endowed with noble and exalted faculties. 

Additionally, Stewart is included in the first chapter of "Words of Fire: An Anthology of African-American Feminist Thought", edited by Beverly Guy Sheftall (1995),  The two speeches by Stewart "Religion And The Pure Principles of Morality, The Sure Foundation On Which We Must Build" and "Lecture Delivered at Franklin Hall" were widely incorporated into a Black Feminist tradition.

Works

Works by Stewart

 Productions of Mrs. Maria W. Stewart presented to the First African Baptist Church and Society of the City of Boston. Boston: Friends of Freedom and Virtue, 1835. Reprinted from The Liberator, Vol. 2, No. 46 (November 17, 1832), p. 183. 
 "A Lecture at the Franklin Hall, Boston, September 21, 1832" (Productions of Mrs. Maria W. Stewart, pp. 51–56), in: Dorothy Porter (ed.), Early Negro Writing, 1760-1837, Black Classic Press, 1995; pp. 136–140.
 "An Address delivered at the African Masonic Hall, Boston, February 27, 1833" (Productions of Mrs. Maria W. Stewart, pp. 63–72), Dorothy Porter (ed.), Early Negro Writing, 1760-1837, Black Classic Press, 1995; pp. 129–135. As "On African Rights and Liberty", in: Margaret Busby (ed.), Daughters of Africa, Ballantine Books, 1994, pp. 47–52.
 Meditations from the Pen of Mrs. Maria W. Stewart: presented to the First African Baptist Church and Society, in the city of Boston. Boston: Printed by Garrison and Knapp, 1879.

Works about Stewart
 Marilyn Richardson, Maria W. Stewart: America's First Black Woman Political Writer, Indiana University Press, 1988.
 Marilyn Richardson, "Maria W. Stewart," in Feintuch, Burt, and David H. Watters (eds), The Encyclopedia Of New England: The Culture and History of an American Region, Yale University Press, 2005.
 Marilyn Richardson, "Maria. W. Stewart", Oxford Companion to African American Literature. Oxford University Press, 1997, pp. 379–380.
 Marilyn Richardson, "'What If I Am A Woman?' Maria W. Stewart's Defense of Black Women's Political Activism", in Donald M. Jacobs (ed.), Courage and Conscience: Black & White Abolitionists in Boston, Indiana University Press, 1993.
 Rodger Streitmatter, "Maria W. Stewart: Firebrand of the Abolition Movement", Raising Her Voice: African-American Woman Journalists Who Changed History, The University Press of Kentucky, 1994, pp. 15–24.

See also

 Sojourner Truth
 Abolitionism in the United States
 Boston Women's Heritage Trail
 List of abolitionists

References

External links
Black Past
 BOAF
 "African Meeting House", BOAF History
 African History
 Blackseek.com
 New York Public Library
 
 
 Lecture delivered at the Franklin Hall, 1832 in google books

African-American abolitionists
Abolitionists from Boston
American feminists
American rhetoricians
1803 births
1879 deaths
Writers from Boston
African-American activists
African-American women journalists
African-American journalists
19th-century American journalists
19th-century American women writers
African-American writers
Lecturers
Christian abolitionists
Women civil rights activists
19th-century African-American writers
19th-century African-American women writers
Burials at Woodlawn Cemetery (Washington, D.C.)
People from Hartford, Connecticut